The sixth season of Winx Club premiered on Nickelodeon in the United States on September 29, 2013 and on Rai 2 in Italy on 6 January 2014.

This season focuses mainly on the Trix allying with Selina, a young witch from Earth who has just enrolled at Cloud Tower as a freshman student, and who is an old childhood best friend of Bloom's. The Winx must earn two new fairy transformations: Bloomix (which is derived from Bloom's almighty Dragon Flame), and Mythix to enter into the fictional Legendarium World and lock the magical book of myths and legends once and for all. In order to do so, they must also find Eldora, the Fairy Godmother, who, like Bloom, has quite a close connection with Selina, and the only one who knows how to seal the indestructible Legendarium for eternity.

Production and broadcast
The season premiered in the United States on September 29, 2013 with the episode "Inspiration of Sirenix". As with the fifth season, this season is formatted in HD and includes both 2D hand-drawn animation and 3D computer animation.

Episodes

References

Winx Club